Sangen til livet (The Song of Life) is a Norwegian film from 1943 based on Johan Bojer's play Sigurd Braa. It was directed by Leif Sinding. The film premiered on October 25, 1943.

Plot
The film is a melodrama about a factory director who is loved by his workers and a power struggle between a good and evil capitalist.

Cast
 Erling Drangsholt as Sigurd Braa, the director general
 Else Budde as Eli Braa, his wife
 Lilleba Svenssen as Gerda Braa, his daughter
 Liv Uchermann Selmer as Mrs. Kamp, Eli Braa's mother
 Finn Lange as Jørgen Roll, a factory director
 Einar Vaage as Brahm, a lawyer
 Oscar Amundsen as Rud, overingeniør
 Folkman Schaanning as Storm, a doctor
 Joachim Holst-Jensen as Graali, an editor
 Ragnhild Østerbye as Laura Graali, the editor's wife
 Tryggve Larssen as Lars Utgaren
 Henny Skjønberg as Amanda Sivertsen, the housekeeper at the Braa home
 Gunnar Simenstad as Nordahl
 Erna Schøyen as Miss Dahle, a teacher

References

External links

Sangen til livet at the National Library of Norway

1943 films
Norwegian black-and-white films
Norwegian drama films
Norwegian films based on plays
1940s Norwegian-language films
Melodrama films
1943 drama films
Films directed by Leif Sinding